Shacha noodles (Simplified Chinese: 沙茶面; Traditional Chinese: 沙茶麵; Pinyin: shā chá miàn), also known as sate or satay noodles, is a noodle dish popular in southern Fujian province. It is a kind of soup noodles made by cooking satay soup made from satay sauce and adding bean sprouts, pork liver, and other auxiliary materials.

On December 11, 1997, Xiamen Wu Zaitian Sate Noodles was identified as one of the first Chinese famous snacks.

Origin 
Satay is originally from Malaysia, but it can also be said to come from Indonesia. Tea drinking is popular in the Minnan region (another expression of southern Fujian province), so the Malay word for sate is translated into Minnan's word for sa-te which is called sha-cha in mandarin. Another saying about the origin of shacha noodle is that "tay" in satay has a similar pronunciation to the local Hokkien word for tea-"cha" so people call this food which is made from satay sauce shacha noodle.

Ingredient 
The common and main ingredients of shacha noodle are shacha sauce, oil noodles, beansprouts and water. Other ingredients can be added for flavor such as fried tofu or shrimp.

See also 
 Fujian cuisine
 List of Chinese dishes
 List of peanut dishes
 Noodle soup
 Peanut sauce
 Shacha sauce

References 

Chinese noodle dishes